The IMAM Ro.63 was an Italian STOL aircraft designed for short-range reconnaissance and light transport during World War II.

Development and design
Interest in a STOL aircraft was raised by the Fieseler Fi 156 Storch acquired from Germany, and in June 1939 the Regia Aeronautica asked Italian aircraft companies to design a similar machine (see below).

The IMAM Ro.63 was of mixed construction with wood, fabric and metal used for the fuselage and wings. It first flew in June 1940, just at the outbreak of World War II. It was put into competition with another Italian aircraft, but clearly proved superior.

It had STOL capabilities similar to the Fi.156, but the larger fuselage held up to four people, and the wings held more fuel. However, there was no defensive armament, as the Fi 156 had from the C version onwards.

The aircraft, designed by Giovanni Galasso, and tested by Aldo Ligabò, could have been a success, but although 150 were ordered, only six were produced from mid-1940 to 1941, due of the shortage of available engines, the Italian engine industry having failed to produce enough suitable Isotta Fraschini Beta engines.

The Ro.63 was a viable machine that was not put into production in significant numbers (practically only a pre-series production) despite the fact that development was completed pre-war. They were doomed by lack of Italian-built engines. The performance was better than the Fi 156, with a superior speed and endurance, and only slightly inferior STOL capabilities. This was due to the more powerful engine and the two-speed propeller.

Operational service

The aircraft was deployed in the North African Campaign, together with 30 Fieseler Fi 156 imported from Germany, even though this was insufficient to replace the IMAM Ro.37 and older reconnaissance aircraft. By 1943, after two years hard service, only one Ro.63 survived. In 1948 it was proposed to resume production, but lack of capacity and data about the aircraft meant that the project was eventually abandoned.

Other STOL aircraft
Other STOL aircraft in the same competition as the Ro.63 included the AVIS C.4 and Caproni GDL. The Avis C.4 had a good performance but suffered from poor flying characteristics.  The Caproni GDL, was not completed.

Operators

Regia Aeronautica

Specifications (Ro.63)

See also

References

 Lembo, Daniele Officine Meccaniche Meridionali, Aerei nella storia magazione, Delta editions, Parma, Oct–Nov 2003 
enricopezzi.it

Notes

Ro.63
1930s Italian military reconnaissance aircraft
1930s Italian military transport aircraft
High-wing aircraft
Single-engined tractor aircraft
STOL aircraft
Aircraft first flown in 1940